Discogobio laticeps is a fish species in the genus Discogobio endemic to southern China.

References

External links 

Cyprinid fish of Asia
Fish described in 1993
Discogobio